The California Festival of Beers is an annual beer festival and one of America's largest and oldest regional beer tastings held at Avila Beach Resort, Avila Beach, California.  Proceeds from the festival benefit the Hospice of San Luis Obispo County.

2020 saw the festival get cancelled caused by the COVID-19 pandemic.

Description
The California Festival of Beers is traditionally held on Memorial Day weekend and features over 50 brewers who feature their micro brewed creations. The event draws a number of college students from the surrounding areas, namely UCSB, Cal Poly, and Fresno. 

Admission includes a souvenir beer glass, unlimited samples of offerings, and free shuttle service. The festival also offers entertainment such as live music and a variety of food stands.

References

External links 
Hospice Beer Fest Website
Hospice Events Page
Avila Beach Golf Resort Website
 Avila Beach, California Scenic Coast

Festivals in California
Beer festivals in the United States
Recurring events established in 1987
Annual events in California
Beer in California
1987 establishments in California